Philip Efraim Feldesman (June 21, 1919 – September 1, 1986) was an American bridge player.

Feldesman was born in Russia in 1919 and immigrated to New York City. He enlisted in the U.S. military in 1943 and became a naturalized citizen the next year.

Bridge accomplishments

Awards

 Fishbein Trophy (1) 1967
 Herman Trophy (1) 1961
 Mott-Smith Trophy (2) 1965, 1966

Wins

 North American Bridge Championships (14)
 Senior Masters Individual (1) 1957 
 von Zedtwitz Life Master Pairs (3) 1961, 1962, 1967 
 Wernher Open Pairs (2) 1961, 1962 
 Open Pairs (1928-1962) (1) 1961 
 Vanderbilt (2) 1965, 1966 
 Mitchell Board-a-Match Teams (3) 1962, 1963, 1966 
 Chicago Mixed Board-a-Match (1) 1973 
 Reisinger (1) 1969

Runners-up

 North American Bridge Championships
 Silodor Open Pairs (1) 1967 
 Blue Ribbon Pairs (1) 1967 
 Vanderbilt (1) 1969 
 Mitchell Board-a-Match Teams (1) 1965 
 Reisinger (1) 1965 
 Spingold (1) 1969

Notes

1986 deaths
1919 births
American contract bridge players
Sportspeople from New York City
American people of Russian-Jewish descent
Soviet emigrants to the United States